Emily's D+Evolution is the fifth studio album by American musician Esperanza Spalding, released on 4 March 2016 by Concord Records.

Background
The album was co-produced by Spalding and longtime David Bowie collaborator Tony Visconti.  On the album, Spalding sings through the alter ego of Emily, which is her middle name. In an interview, Spalding stated that Emily "is a spirit, or a being, or an aspect who I met, or became aware of. I recognize that my job...is to be her arms and ears and voice and body".

Critical reception

Emily's D+Evolution received widespread critical acclaim from contemporary music critics. At Metacritic, which assigns a normalized rating out of 100 to reviews from mainstream critics, the album received an average score of 84, based on 14 reviews, which indicates "universal acclaim".

Marcus J. Moore of Pitchfork Media praised the album, stating, "The lyrics are elusive at first, darting behind fast-moving songs and delivered in impressionistic, conversational bursts that recall the delivery of Joni Mitchell. But the fearless generosity behind them communicates itself loud and clear, and it's a spirit that animates the entire album. With it, Spalding has once again redefined an already singular career, dictating a vision entirely on her own terms". Michael J. Warren of Exclaim! commented, "Emily's D+Evolution is a tough album to get a full grasp on. It's not a neat alter ego side project; rather than going the Chris Gaines route, Esperanza Spalding is again flexing her range, showing that her playing style and voice can find a home in any genre. There are moments here where she falls into a nice pocket that the listener might wish she'd remain in for a little while longer." Christopher R. Weingarten of Rolling Stone added, "...Emily’s D+Evolution is a far more ambitious and thornier affair. The lyrics, flowing in disjunctive clusters, are about deleted narratives, glass ceilings and dreams deferred – ultimately a complex, funky prog-rock concept opera about love and identity.

Track listing

Personnel
Credits adapted from the liner notes of Emily's D+Evolution.

Main personnel
 Esperanza Spalding – vocals, bass (tracks 1-11, 13, 14), piano (10, 12), bass synthesizer (12)
 Matthew Stevens – guitar
 Karriem Riggins – drums (2-5, 7, 8, 10, 13), percussion (9)
 Justin Tyson – drums (1, 6, 11, 12, 14)
 Corey King – backing vocals (1, 2, 5-7, 12-14), synthesizer (6), trombone (8), keyboards (12)
 Emily Elbert – backing vocals (1, 6, 11, 12, 14)
 Nadia Washington – backing vocals (2, 5, 7, 13)
 Celeste Butler, Fred Martin, Katriz Trinidad, Kimberly L. Cook-Ratliff – backing vocals (11)

Additional personnel
 Esperanza Spalding – production
 Tony Visconti – production (2-5, 7-10, 13), mixing (2-5, 7, 9, 10)
 Kyle Hoffman – engineering
 Tim Price – engineering
 Erin Tonkon, Kyle McAulay, Martin Cooke, Nicolas Fournier – assistant engineering
 Rich Costey – mixing (1, 6, 8, 11, 12, 13)
 Mario Borgatta – assistant mixing
 Paul Blakemore – mastering
 Lawrence Azerrad – graphics, design
 Holly Andres – photography

Charts

References

Esperanza Spalding albums
2016 albums
Albums produced by Tony Visconti